The Baltic Soul Weekender is an annual music festival with a maximum attendance of 4,700 visitors held for the first time in 2007. The Baltic Soul Weekender offers a musical journey through the past decades of music: soul, funk, soulful house and disco. In addition to live acts, the visitor can also listen to well-known djs. It is Germany's only weekender that includes accommodation at the festival location. The festival was founded by the disc jockey and event manager Daniel Dombrowe (Dan D.).

Location 
From 2007 to 2013 the location was 120 km north of Hamburg, Germany, at the Holidayparc Weissenhäuser Strand at the Baltic Sea. From 2014 to 2016 the event took place at the Center Parc Bispinger Heide. In November 2014, a one-time dj weekender was held. After the previously organizing Soul Weekender GmbH had to file for bankruptcy in 2015, the agency Four Artists from Berlin has organized the Baltic Soul Weekender since 2016. Dan Dombrowe remained as creative director. Since 2018 the event takes place again at the Holidayparc Weissenhäuser Strand. In 2020, Four Artists ceased operations independently of the Baltic Soul Weekender. KJ Projects GmbH has been the organizer of the event since 2022.

Historical overview and Line-up 
Various artists and live acts have performed on stage at the Baltic Soul Weekender in the past. Meanwhile and after the end of the stage program, there was music from various disc jockeys on smaller so-called floors (dance areas). All day long various DJs were playing music on the Baltic Soul TV, which is available in all rooms.

Compilations 
Since today five Baltic Soul Weekender compilation albums with rare songs have been released on vinyl (only volume 2 to 5) and cd. The following tables contain the tracklistings of the vinyls released with fewer tracks and cds.

#1 – Weekender Anthems

#2 – Soulful & Funk 70's

#3 – Philly Sound & Charity Projects

#4 – Soulful & New Dan's Classics

#5 – Modern & Classic Steppers

Charity 
The Baltic Soul Weekender is not only a music festival, it also supports legendary soul artists all over the world. Although it sometimes takes years to find these people, it is much easier finding them than to persuade them having a comeback after not been on stage for 30 years or more. The Baltic Soul Weekender makes it its business to support these artists and take care of legal, social and financial aspects in their life.

Other Weekenders in Germany 
 Hanseatic Soul Weekender
 Northern Soul Weekender Aachen
 Nürnberg Weekender

External links 
 Website of Baltic Soul Weekender

References 

Music festivals in Germany
2007 establishments in Germany
Music festivals established in 2007